Lucas Pouille was the defending champion, but lost in the second round to John Millman.

Marco Cecchinato won his first ATP title, defeating Millman in the final, 7–5, 6–4. Cecchinato was a lucky loser, the ninth in ATP Tour history to win a title.

Seeds
The top four seeds received a bye into the second round.

Draw

Finals

Top half

Bottom half

Qualifying

Seeds

Qualifiers

Lucky losers

Qualifying draw

First qualifier

Second qualifier

Third qualifier

Fourth qualifier

References

External links
 Main draw
 Qualifying draw

2018 ATP World Tour
2018 Singles